Laluk may refer to:
 Laluk, Babol
 Laluk, Savadkuh